The Turkish Regional Jet (TRJ) was a project to produce Turkey's first regional airplane. The project would use a modified version of the Dornier 328, the TRJ-328 and TRJ-628. The project was cancelled in 2017 because it was “economically unfeasible”.

TRJ-328
The TRJ-328 was to be used as a test bed for the TRJ-628. Capacity was to be limited to 32 seats. The  aircraft would fill direct and frequent flights to and from small cities in Turkey which were not then possible with larger aircraft.

TRJ-628
The TRJ-628 was to feature 60 to 70 seats and would be an overall larger airplane.

References

Airliners
Turkish civil aircraft